Olivier Deriviere (born 26 December 1978) is a French video game composer, best known for his work on the Alone in the Dark, Obscure, Remember Me and Streets of Rage 4 soundtracks. His work on Remember Me won the 2013 IFMCA award for Best Original Score for a Video Game or Interactive Media.

Career 
Deriviere took interest in music since childhood, studying classical percussion at the age of five. At the age of eight, Deliviere's mother bought a synthesizer, which he used to write various short pieces, and took interest in game music after hearing the main menu theme for Shadow of the Beast, which led to Deriviere  taking advanced harmony and orchestration courses. Deriviere received training at the Nice Conservatoire and Berklee College of Music, and made his debut in the game industry with the soundtrack for Obscure. 

Following his work on Obscure, Deriviere was contacted by Atari representatives to compose for Alone in the Dark. As the game was more-action oriented, Deriviere sought to compose the music with an epic scale in mind. Deriviere also discussed the game with director David Nadal to ensure a mutual understanding of the soundtrack's approach. In 2010, Deriviere established  AMEO Productions, a music production company dedicated to video game scoring. The same year saw the release of Might and Magic: Heroes Kingdoms, for which Deriviere composed the cut-scene music. In 2013, Deriviere composed the soundtrack of Remember Me. Deriviere sought to reflect the game's theme of digitized memories by manipulating the recordings of a live orchestra, giving the impession of synthesized and acoustic instruments. For his work on the soundtrack, Deriviere won the 2013 IFMCA award for Best Original Score for a Video Game or Interactive Media.

In 2018, Deriviere composed for Vampyr, using a cello as the primary instrument to convey a sense of a sense of emptiness and solitude. Other instruments, such as bass flute, piano, double bass and cimbalom, were used to characterise aspects of the story. In the same year, Deriviere composed the soundtrack for 11-11: Memories Retold, having heard of the project during the  Nordic Game Conference in Sweden. In 2020, Deriviere served as the lead composer for Streets of Rage 4, with additional music by Yuzo Koshiro, Motohiro Kawashima, Yoko Shimomura, Keiji Yamagishi, Harumi Fujita, XL Middleton, Scattle, Das Mörtal, and Groundislava. Deriviere wrote the game's main themes, while each boss fight's theme was written by one of the guest composers. Deriviere composed the soundtrack of Dying Light 2 Stay Human, which released in 2022. For the music, Deriviere collaborated with the London Contemporary Orchestra, and used a custom-built instrument.

Discography 
Video games

Other work

Awards and nominations

References

External links 
 
  at Reviewgraveyard.com

1978 births
French composers
French male composers
Living people
Video game composers
Place of birth missing (living people)